

Teams
A total of eighteen teams contested the league, including sixteen sides from the 1976–77 season and two sides promoted from the 1976–77 Yugoslav Second League (YSL) as winners of the two second level divisions East and West. The league was contested in a double round robin format, with each club playing every other club twice, for a total of 34 rounds. Two points were awarded for wins and one point for draws.

Napredak and Željezničar were relegated from the 1976–77 Yugoslav First League after finishing the season in bottom two places of the league table. The two clubs promoted to top level were Trepča and NK Osijek.

League table

Results

Winning squad

Top scorers

Attendance

Overall league attendance per match: 9,845 spectators

See also
1977–78 Yugoslav Cup

External links
Yugoslavia Domestic Football Full Tables

Yugoslav First League seasons
Yugo
1977–78 in Yugoslav football